Odontosagda is a genus of air-breathing land snails, terrestrial pulmonate gastropod mollusks in the family Sagdidae.

Species 
Species within the genus Odontosagda include:
 Odontosagda blandii
 Odontosagda superbum
 Odontosagda suprema

References 

Sagdidae